Moscow Vacation is a 1995 Russian romantic comedy film directed by Alla Surikova.

Plot 
The film tells about a rich Italian woman who goes to Russia to bury her dog there and on the way meeting a man who falls in love at first sight.

Cast 

 Oleg Anofriyev

References

External links 
 

1995 films
1990s Russian-language films
Russian romantic comedy films
1995 romantic comedy films